Ronald John McNeill, 1st Baron Cushendun, PC (30 April 1861 – 12 October 1934), was a British Conservative politician.

Background and education
McNeill was born in Ulster. He was the son of Edmund McNeill, DL, JP, and Sheriff of County Antrim, and his wife Mary (née Miller). He was educated at Harrow and Christ Church, Oxford, graduating in 1886.  He was  called to the bar in 1888, and started to work as editor of The St James's Gazette (1900–04) as well as assistant editor of the Encyclopædia Britannica (1906–10).

Political career
Having unsuccessfully contested the seats of West Aberdeenshire (1906), Aberdeen South (1907 and Jan 1910), and Kirkcudbrightshire (Dec 1910), McNeill was elected as Unionist Member of Parliament for the St Augustine's division of Kent in 1911. Seven years later he became representative for Canterbury, and in 1922 was appointed Under-Secretary of State for Foreign Affairs, a post he held, with a short interval for the first Labour Government of 1924, until 1925.

After serving as Financial Secretary to the Treasury for two years, McNeill was made Chancellor of the Duchy of Lancaster with a seat in the cabinet in 1927. The same year he was also sworn of the Privy Council and, in November 1927, raised to the peerage as The Baron Cushendun, of Cushendun in the County of Antrim.  Acting Foreign Secretary in 1928 and twice chief British representative to the League of Nations, Lord Cushendun signed the Kellogg-Briand Pact in August that year. He retired from office in 1929.

Cushendun and Glenmona House

From 1910, McNeill resided, when not in London, at Glenmona House in Cushendun, the coastal village in the Glens of Antrim in County Antrim from which he later took his title. He was burnt out of the house in 1922, having a replacement built that was designed by Clough Williams-Ellis. The village also contains buildings designed by Williams-Ellis, built in memory of Lord Cushendun's Cornish wife, Maud, who died in 1925.

Family
In 1884, the future Lord Cushendun married Elizabeth Maud Bolitho (sister of William Bolitho), a Cornishwoman and Christian Scientist. They had three daughters: Esther Rose, Loveday Violet, and Mary Morvenna Bolitho (who married Major Philip Le Grand Gribble, military correspondent and memoirist). After Elizabeth's death in 1925 he married Catherine Sydney Louisa Margesson in 1930. She survived him, dying in 1939. Lord Cushendun died in Cushendun in October 1934, aged 73, when the barony became extinct.

References

External links 

 
 
 
 
 

Cushendun, Ronald John McNeill, Baron
Cushendun, Ronald John McNeill, Baron
People educated at Harrow School
Alumni of Christ Church, Oxford
Macneill, Ronald
Macneill, Ronald
Cushendun, Ronald McNeill, 1st Baron
Cushendun, Ronald John McNeill, Baron
Macneill, Ronald
Macneill, Ronald
Macneill, Ronald
Macneill, Ronald
Macneill, Ronald
UK MPs who were granted peerages
Ronald
Politics of Canterbury
Irish cricketers
Marylebone Cricket Club cricketers
Barons created by George V
Politicians from Northern Ireland